Wentworth was a provincial riding in Ontario, Canada, that was created for the 1934 election. It was abolished prior to the 1987 election. It was merged into the ridings of Wentworth East and Wentworth North before 1987 election.

Members of Provincial Parliament

References

Notes

Citations

Former provincial electoral districts of Ontario